These are the official results of the Men's 50 km walk event at the 1982 European Championships in Athens, Greece, held on 10 September 1982.

Medalists

Abbreviations
All times shown are in hours:minutes:seconds

Results

Final
10 September

Participation
According to an unofficial count, 24 athletes from 12 countries participated in the event.

 (1)
 (1)
 (2)
 (1)
 (2)
 (3)
 (2)
 (2)
 (3)
 (3)
 (3)
 (1)

See also
 1978 Men's European Championships 50km Walk (Prague)
 1980 Men's Olympic 50km Walk (Moscow)
 1983 Men's World Championships 50km Walk (Helsinki)
 1984 Men's Olympic 50km Walk (Los Angeles)
 1986 Men's European Championships 50km Walk (Stuttgart)
 1987 Men's World Championships 50km Walk (Rome)
 1988 Men's Olympic 50km Walk (Seoul)

References

 Results
 sportarch

50 kilometres race walk
Racewalking at the European Athletics Championships